F140 or variation, may refer to:

 Ferrari Enzo Ferrari (model F140) supercar
 Ferrari F140 engine (automobile engine), engine used in the Ferrari Enzo supercar and other cars
 TRAXX F140 (train engine), see TRAXX
 , Indian Navy frigate warship
 HMS Eastway (F140), British Royal Navy frigate warship, see HMS Battleaxe
 Farman F.140 Super Goliath, 4-engine biplane bomber warplane

See also